Theron Otis Feemster, commonly known as Theron Feemster, also known by the names Ron Feemster or Neff-U, is a Grammy Award winning American record producer, multi-instrumentalist and songwriter.

Life and career
Theron "Neff-U" Feemster is a Grammy-award winning producer, songwriter, and composer who has worked with Michael Jackson, Dr. Dre, Eminem, Ne-Yo, Justin Bieber, and Sia among many others.

Feemster was born and raised in Grover, North Carolina. He studied at Berklee College of Music in Massachusetts and now resides in Los Angeles. He is best known for being a co-writer and producer on the 2002 song Black Suits Comin' (Nod Ya Head), which was featured in the film Men in Black II.

Production discography

2002
The Eminem Show by Eminem
"Business"
"When the Music Stops"
"Say What You Say"
"My Dad's Gone Crazy"

2003
Get Rich or Die Tryin' by 50 Cent
"Back Down"

Terrorist Threats by Westside Connection
"Get Ignit"

Love & Life by Mary J. Blige
"Not Today"  (featuring Eve)

2004
Afrodisiac by Brandy
"Say You Will"

Turning Point by Mario
"18"
"Couldn't Say No"
"Here I Go Again"

2005
Unpredictable by Jamie Foxx
"Wish U Were Here"

2006
In My Own Words by Ne-Yo
"Stay"
"Sign Me Up"

2007
Because of You by Ne-Yo
"Crazy"  (featuring Jay-Z) 

Luvanmusiq by Musiq Soulchild
"Millionaire"

Growing Pains by Mary J. Blige
"Work That"
"Feel Like A Woman"

Unbreakable by Backstreet Boys
"Treat Me Right"

Rockstar Mentality by Shop Boyz
"Rockstar Mentality"
"Showin' Me Love"

Stomp The Yard by Sean Biggs
"Never Gonna Get It"  (featuring Topic & Akon)

2008
The Truth by Cherish
"Damages"

Brass Knuckles by Nelly
"L.A."  (featuring Snoop Dogg & Nate Dogg) 
"Wadsyaname" (promo only)

The Declaration by Ashanti
"In These Streets"

A Different Me by Keyshia Cole
"Erotic"
"You Complete Me"

2009
Lady Love by Letoya
"Lady Love"

At That Point by Teairra Marí
"Built For This"

2010
Can't Take That Away From Me by JoJo
"Can't Take That Away From Me"
"Running on Empty"

Michael by Michael Jackson
"Hollywood Tonight"
"Best of Joy"
"(I Like) The Way You Love Me"

2011
Perfectionist by Natalia Kills
"Wonderland"
"Break You Hard"
"Superficial"
"If I Was God"

The Cimfam EP by Cimorelli
"Million Bucks"

2012
The Secret World of Arrietty by Bridgit Mendler
"Summertime"

Til the Casket Drops by ZZ Ward
"Til the Casket Drops" 
"Put the Gun Down"
"Move Like U Stole It" 
"If I Could Be Her" 
"Charlie Ain't Home"

2013
Lift Your Spirit by Aloe Blacc
"Wanna Be With You"

2015
Compton by Dr. Dre
 "Issues" (featuring Ice Cube, Anderson .Paak, & Dem Jointz)
 "Just Another Day" (performed by The Game featuring Asia Bryant)

Purpose by Justin Bieber
 "I'll Show You"
 "Purpose"  (piano)
 "Life is Worth Living (musician)

The Documentary 2 by The Game Don't Trip (featuring Ice Cube, Dr. Dre, Will.i.am)

A Volte Esagero by Marracash feat Salmo and Coez

Fumo by Clementino

2016 
Sofia Reyes
 Llegaste Tu by Sofia Reyes

The Definition Of...  by  Fantasia
 When I Met You

2017 
A Girl A Bottle A Boat by Train 
 Drink Up
 Loverman
Fenomeno by Fabri Fibra
 Red carpet

2018 
90 min by Salmo

2019 
Hot Pink by Doja Cat
 "Streets"

References

External links
 
 

Record producers from North Carolina
Living people
Year of birth missing (living people)